The Federation of Young European Greens, often referred to as FYEG, is an umbrella organisation that gathers young green movements and organisations across Europe with 40,000 members. FYEG's aim is to defend climate and social justice on the European level. Since 2007, FYEG is the European Green Party's youth wing.

FYEG has 30 member organisations, 5 candidates and 2 associate members, along with two partner organisations - the Global Young Greens and Cooperation and Development Network Eastern Europe. It is a closer partner of the Green European Foundation, the European Green Party, and the Green Academy. It also holds a full membership to the European Youth Forum (EYF) which operates within the Council of Europe and European Union youth engagement frameworks and works closely with both these bodies.

History 
The Federation of Young European Greens was created in 1988. Gerard Onesta was one of the founding members. The idea of a European federation was brought up in Strasbourg in 1988 by French, Belgian, Luxemburgish and German young members from Green parties.

In 2002, during a FYEG General Assembly in Belgrade, the Cooperation and Development network (CDN) was founded, with the aim of better supporting green youth organisations in Eastern and South Eastern Europe, which were often smaller and organisationally less developed than their Western European counterparts.

From then on, FYEG became more political and strengthened its links with the European Green Party (EGP) and European Youth Fourm (EYF). In 2007, it became EGP's official youth wing and gained voting rights in EGP's organs.

In 2009, FYEG launched its first internal European campaign in order to promote young candidates at the European elections. Three MEPs, who were among the youngest ever, were elected to the European Parliament: Ska Keller, Jan Philipp Albrecht and Karima Delli. Similar programmes in subsequent elections have had equal success, with notable successes with Terry Reintke, Linnéa Engström, and Ernest Urtasun

At the 2018 General Assembly, FYEG celebrated its 30th anniversary, and for the first time elected two female co-spokespeople: Zuzana Pavelková from Mladí zelení and Katri Ylinen, from ViNO.

Activities 

Like many other European Party-Political Youth Organisations, FYEG's main activities consist of lobbying its mother party within internal and external channels, engaging in broader European political discourse on topics relevant to it and its member organisations - notably migration and LGBTQ rights - and organising international youth exchanges with EU and Council of Europe funding. These have included Study Sessions at the Council of Europe Youth Centres in Strasbourg and Budapest, and summer camps and training sessions in various locations around Europe.

Structures

General Assembly (GA) 
The General Assembly (GA) is the highest decision-making body of FYEG. All full member organisations have two votes in the GA, candidate member organisations have one vote and observer (partner) organisations can send observers.

The General Assembly is held yearly in a different country. It is during the General Assembly that members of the different structures are elected.

Executive Committee (EC) 
The executive committee is the second highest decision-making body in FYEG. It handles the management of the federation on a day-to-day basis. The EC is composed of 8 members. Within the EC, there are two co-spokespersons and a treasurer. The EC members are elected for one year and can renew their mandates three times.

Finance Control and Advisory Committee (FCAC) 
The FCC's tasks include a yearly meeting, dedicated to checking FYEG's finances. A written report of this meeting must be submitted to the EC, thereby providing an internal audit and the presentation of this yearly report to the delegates at the GA.

Members of the FCC are elected for two years by the GA.

Advisory Committee (AC) 
The advisory Committee follows the functioning of the EC and personnel and they assist in conflict resolution between EC members and/or personnel. These are usually former EC members or people who were involved in FYEG. The Advisory Committee ensures the transfer of knowledge within FYEG and acts as a conflict resolution body. It is elected for two years at the GA and is composed of 5 members. Action by the AC is taken only upon request by EC members of other bodies of FYEG. They are elected for two years by the GA.

Working groups 
The Working groups are a place for our activists to meet, debate topics and develop campaigns and ideas. They are in charge of building and communicating positions internally and externally with the approval of the EC. Each working group consist of at least 5 people from 5 different MOs.

Office staff 
The office staff has at least one Secretary General (elected for two years by the General Assembly) and a Project Assistant. The Sec Gen is responsible of the daily management of FYEG regarding finances, co-ordination of the office, fund-raising, representation, reporting, networking and legal representation. The Project Assistant is in charge of project management, organisation of FYEG events and giving and administrative support to the SecGen.

Members

References

External links 

Greens, Federation of Young
Youth wings of green parties in Europe
Environmental organisations based in Belgium
European Green Party